Cobbler(s) may refer to:

A person who repairs, and sometimes makes, shoes

Places
 The Cobbler, a mountain located near the head of Loch Long in Scotland
 Mount Cobbler, Australia

Art, entertainment and media
 The Cobbler (1923 film), a short comedy by Hal Roach
 The Cobbler (2014 film), a comedy-drama starring Adam Sandler
 "Cobbler" (Better Call Saul), an episode of the TV series Better Call Saul

Animals
 Cobbler or river cobbler, a marketing name in the UK for Southeast Asian Pangasius bocourti and Pangasius pangasius (also marketed as "basa", "pangasius" and "panga")
 Cobbler, a common name for Cnidoglanis macrocephalus, a species of catfish found along the coasts of Australia
 Cobbler, a common name for the South Australian cobbler, a brown fish found in estuaries in southern Australia
 Cobbler (Condica sutor), a North American moth in the family Noctuidae

Other uses
 Cobbler (food), a type of pie
 Cobbler (software), a network-oriented install server for Linux
 , a United States Navy ship name
 , a former submarine in the United States Navy
 "The Cobblers", a nickname for the English association football club Northampton Town F.C.
 Cobblers, a slang term for "nonsense"

See also

 Cobble (disambiguation)